The Face of Britain was a series of topographical books published by B. T. Batsford from the 1930s to the 1950s that has been described as playing a part in the construction of English identity in that period. The series is notable for the covers by Brian Batsford, who worked under the name Brian Cook.

Volumes
This list may be incomplete.

England
 Chiltern Country by H. J. Massingham (1940)
 Cotswold Country by H. J. Massingham (1941)
 East Anglia: A survey of England's eastern counties, etc. by Doreen Wallace (1939, 2nd 1943)
 English Downland by H. J. Massingham (1936)
 English Lakeland by Doreen Wallace (1940)
 The Home Counties by  S. P. B. Mais (1942) (2nd edition 1947)
 The Islands of England: A survey of the islands around England and Wales, and the Channel Islands by J. H. Ingram (1952)
 Lancashire and the Pennines. A survey of Lancashire, and parts of Northumberland, Durham, Cumberland, Westmorland and Yorkshire. by Frank Singleton (1952)
 Lincolnshire and the Fens by M. W. Barley (1952)
 Midland England by W. G. Hoskins (1949)
 North Country by Edmund Vale (1937)
 North Midland Country: A survey of Cheshire, Derbyshire, Leicestershire, Nottinghamshire and Staffordshire by J. H. Ingram (1948)
 Shakespeare's Country by John Russell (1942)
 South-Eastern Survey. A last look round Sussex, Kent and Surrey ... Illustrated from the author's photographs. by Richard Wyndham (1940). Revised as South-East England by Ronald Jessup.
 Wessex: Dorset, Wiltshire, with West Berkshire & East Somerset by Ralph Dutton (1950)
 West Country by C. Henry Warren (1938)

Scotland
 The Highlands of Scotland by Hugh Quigley, photographs by Robert M. Adam. (1936)
 The Lowlands of Scotland by George Scott-Moncrieff (1939)
 Scottish Border Country: Roxburghshire and parts of Northumberland, Cumberland, Berwickshire, Selkirkshire and Dumfrieshire.  by F. R. Banks (1951)

Wales
 The Face of Wales by Tudor Edwards (1950)
 Welsh Border Country by P. Thoresby Jones (1938)

(Northern) Ireland
 The Face of Ulster: Antrim, Londonderry, Fermanagh, Tyrone, Armagh, Monaghan, Cavan, Donegal and Down by Denis O`Donoghue Hanna (1952)

The television series "Penelope Keith's Hidden Villages" was based on the book series.

See also
 County Books series
 The Regions of Britain
 The Regional Books

References

Further reading
 Batsford, Brian Cook. (1987) The Britain of Brian Cook. London: Batsford.

External links 
https://www.librarything.com/nseries/67667/The-Face-of-Britain

Series of non-fiction books
Books about the United Kingdom